Arne Lindblad (30 January 1887 – 19 December 1964) was a Swedish film actor. He appeared in more than 100 films between 1934 and 1964.

Selected filmography

 Simon of Backabo (1934)
 Johan Ulfstjerna (1936)
 Unfriendly Relations (1936)
 The Girls of Uppakra (1936)
 Hotel Paradise (1937)
 Career (1938)
 Adolf Saves the Day (1938)
 Mot nya tider (1939)
 Life Begins Today (1939)
 We at Solglantan (1939)
 The Two of Us (1939)
 Kiss Her! (1940)
 Hanna in Society (1940)
 Her Melody (1940)
 Heroes in Yellow and Blue (1940)
 The Three of Us (1940)
 The Crazy Family (1940)
 Sunny Sunberg (1941)
 The Ghost Reporter (1941)
 Lasse-Maja (1941)
 The Poor Millionaire (1941)
 Sun Over Klara (1942)
 Adventurer (1942)
 A Girl for Me (1943)
 In Darkest Smaland (1943)
 Johansson and Vestman (1946)
 The Balloon (1946)
  Kristin Commands (1946)
 Crisis (1946)
 Wedding Night (1947)
 How to Love (1947)
 Don't Give Up (1947)
 Neglected by His Wife (1947)
 Poor Little Sven (1947)
 Music in Darkness (1948)
 Loffe as a Millionaire (1948)
 Number 17 (1949)
 Father Bom (1949)
 Two Stories Up (1950)
 Perhaps a Gentleman (1950)
 Customs Officer Bom (1951)
 Bom the Flyer (1952)
 Say It with Flowers (1952)
 Kalle Karlsson of Jularbo (1952)
 Ursula, the Girl from the Finnish Forests (1953)
 Stupid Bom (1953)
 Dance, My Doll (1953)
 Our Father and the Gypsy (1954)
 Darling of Mine (1955)
 The Light from Lund (1955)
 Stage Entrance (1956)
 The Biscuit (1956)

References

External links

1887 births
1964 deaths
Swedish male film actors